elc International School is an international school located across two campuses in Selangor, Malaysia: one in Sungai Buloh and one in Cyberjaya.

History

elc International School started as elc Secondary School in 1987 with 5 students and 6 teachers including the Principal. The school was formed in order to provide a legitimate vehicle to privately educate this small group of children, 3 of whom were the children of the founders namely Dr. & Mrs. Kaloo and Dr & Mrs. Ghazalli.

The School was registered as a secondary school, under the terms of the Education Act 1961, to prepare qualified children for the GCE ‘O’ Levels in May 1989. In June 1992, the school was given permission to add a Primary Division to the established Secondary Division. During this time, elc operated out of two campuses within the Taman Tun Dr. Ismail area, one for the Primary Division and another for the Secondary Division.

Sungai Buloh
Around 1995 a decision was made to consolidate the Primary and Secondary division and operate out of a single campus. In January 1997 elc relocated to its new campus at Sungai Buloh, Selangor.

Cyberjaya
The success of Sungai Buloh campus motivated the school authorities to expand to a second campus and offer the benefit of our education to more children. Thus, elc International School, Cyberjaya Campus opened its doors for the first time on September 6th 2010.  Following in the footsteps of its sister campus, Cyberjaya started small and grew to rival the other bigger international schools in the region.

Values

The three core values of elc International School are embedded in its name — ‘excellence in everything we do’, ‘loyalty to each other and the school’ and ‘commitment to continuous improvement’. These values are enhanced by the school motto ‘Learn to Aspire’ and students are encouraged to aspire to succeed in reaching their personal, social and academic potential.

References

 https://www.elc.edu.my/history/ 
 https://www.elc.edu.my/elc-tradition/

British international schools in Malaysia
Educational institutions established in 1987
1987 establishments in Malaysia
Cambridge schools in Malaysia
Schools in Selangor